The Engin de débarquement amphibie rapide (EDA-R) is a class of roll-on/roll-off catamaran landing craft (L-CAT) ordered by the French Navy. They transport weapons systems, equipment, cargo and personnel of the assault elements from s to shore and across the beach.

Design and development

Concept design of the EDA-R began in 2000 at Constructions industrielles de la Méditerranée (CNIM) then was abandoned in 2003 and relaunched in 2008 with the full-scale Landing Catamaran (L-Cat). During the development stage, one prototype was built by Gamelin Shipyard and tested during an autonomous transfer from Saint-Malo to the Military port of Toulon. On 14 October 2008, the prototype of the L-Cat beached on the shores of Toulon. In March 2010, it offloaded a 54-ton Leclerc main battle tank at Toulon.

According to CNIM the craft delivers the performance of an aircushion landing craft but at the cost of a conventional landing craft. Four units have been purchased and were presented to the French Navy in January 2011.

In October 2016, CNIM revealed a new variant called L-CAT shore-to-shore, designed for smaller navies that do not have larger amphibious ships to deploy landing craft from. Because of its potential to operate independently, it is fitted with the LYNCEA naval mission management system, and can be mounted with various features such as two unmanned 20 mm guns or a towed array system providing submarine detection capabilities.

Operators

 French Navy (4 units)

 Egyptian Navy (February 2015: 2 units)

Specifications (EDA-R)

Source: Naval-Technology Fact File
Builder: Socarenam
Date Deployed: June 2011
Propulsion:
 Four MTU Friedrichshafen 12V2000 M92 Diesel engines 1220 kW
 Four Wärtsilä Pump-jets
Length: 30 metres (98 feet 43 inches)
Beam: 12.8 metres (42 feet)
Displacement: 285 metric tons
Speed:  with full load,  maximum speed,  platform lowered.
Range: 400 nautical miles
Crew: 8
Load: 80 tons (110 tons overload in lighter mode)
Military lift: cargo platform 126m² and 80 tons.
Armament: two 12.7 mm and two 7.62 mm machine guns.
Radar:

See also
 Landing Craft Air Cushion
 Lebed-class LCAC
 Type 726 LCAC
 Solgae-class LCAC
 Tsaplya-class LCAC
 Zubr-class LCAC

References

External links

 EDA-R specifications on Naval-Technology.org
 3D animation of the EDA-R

Landing craft
Amphibious warfare vessels of the French Navy
2011 ships
Ship classes of the French Navy